Mariute is a 1918 Italian silent drama film directed by Edoardo Bencivenga and starring Francesca Bertini.

Cast
 Alberto Albertini 
 Francesca Bertini 
 Camillo De Riso 
 Livio Pavanelli 
 Gustavo Serena

References

Bibliography 
 Moliterno, Gino. The A to Z of Italian Cinema. Scarecrow Press, 2009.

External links 
 

1918 films
1918 drama films
Italian drama films
1910s Italian-language films
Italian silent short films
Films directed by Edoardo Bencivenga
Italian black-and-white films
Silent drama films